Christopher Frederick Sains (born 3 August 1978) is an English cricketer.  Sains is a right-handed batsman who bowls right-arm fast-medium.  He was born in Romford, London.

Sains represented the Essex Cricket Board in a single List A match against the Lancashire Cricket Board in the 2000 NatWest Trophy.  In his only List A match, he scored an unbeaten 2 runs.

He currently plays club cricket for Hornchurch Cricket Club.

References

External links
Christopher Sains at Cricinfo
Christopher Sains at CricketArchive

1978 births
Living people
People from Romford
Sportspeople from Essex
English cricketers
Essex Cricket Board cricketers